Konrad Boehmer (24 May 1941 – 4 October 2014) was a German-Dutch composer, educator, and writer.

Life
Boehmer was born in Berlin. A self-declared member of the Darmstadt School, he studied composition in Cologne with Karlheinz Stockhausen and Gottfried Michael Koenig, and philosophy, sociology, and musicology at the University of Cologne, where he received a PhD in 1966. After receiving his doctorate, he settled in Amsterdam, working until 1968 at the Institute for Sonology, Utrecht University. In 1972, he was appointed professor of music history and theory at the Royal Conservatory of The Hague.

Musical style
His compositions characteristically employ serial organization or montage, sometimes with elements of jazz and rock music (as in his opera Doktor Faustus and the electronic Apocalipsis cum figuris). In other works, such as Canciones del camino and Lied uit de vert, Marxist songs serve as basic material.

In 2001, the Holland Festival commissioned Boehmer to write a composition for the rock band Sonic Youth, which they performed at both concerts during that festival in the Stadsschouwburg Amsterdam.

Death
On 10 August 2014, while on holiday in the south of France, he suffered a cerebral infarction. He was taken to Amsterdam, where he died on 4 October 2014.

Selected compositions
 Variation for chamber orchestra (1959–61)
 Position for electronic sounds, vocal sounds, and orchestra (1960–61)
 Zeitläufte for eight instruments (1962)
 Information (1964–65)
 Aspekt electronic music (1964–66)
 Canciones del camino for orchestra (1973–74)
 Schrei dieser Erde for percussion and tape, (1979)
 Doktor Faustus opera (1980–83)
 Apocalipsis cum figuris, electronic music (1984)
 Woutertje Pieterse for nine vocalists and orchestra (1985–1987)
 Il combattimento for violin, cello, and orchestra (1989–90)
 Et in Arcadia ego for string quartet (1992)
 Kronos protos for 14 instruments (1995)
 Nuba for flute, viola and harp (1998)
 Orpheus Unplugged (1999–2000) piano and tape
 Ouroboros for piano (2002)
 Doktor Fausti Höllenfahrt for orchestra (2006)

References

Cited sources

Further reading
 Boehmer, Konrad. 1967. Zur Theorie der offenen Form in der neuen Musik. Darmstadt: Edition Tonos. (Second edition 1988.)
 Boehmer, Konrad. 1970. Zwischen Reihe und Pop: Musik und Klassengesellschaft. J & V Musik. Vienna and Munich: Jugend und Volk.
 Boehmer, Konrad. 2009. Doppelschläge: Texte zur Musik, vol. 1: 1958–1967. Quellentexte zur Musik des 20. /21. Jahrhunderts 12.1, edited by Stefan Fricke and Christian Grün. Saarbrücken: Pfau. .
 Boehmer, Konrad. 2014. Doppelschläge: Texte zur Musik, vol. 2: 1968–1970. Quellentexte zur Musik des 20. /21. Jahrhunderts 12.2, edited by Stefan Fricke and Christian Grün. Saarbrücken: Pfau. .

External links
 

1941 births
2014 deaths
20th-century classical composers
20th-century German composers
20th-century German male musicians
21st-century classical composers
21st-century German composers
21st-century German male musicians
Dutch classical composers
Dutch male classical composers
German classical composers
German male classical composers
LGBT classical composers
Musicians from Berlin
Pupils of Karlheinz Stockhausen
Academic staff of the Royal Conservatory of The Hague